Sarguna Lingeswarar Temple(சற்குணலிங்கேஸ்வரர் கோயில்), also known as the Karukudi Nathar Temple, is a Hindu temple located at Marudhanallur in the Thanjavur district of Tamil Nadu, India. The temple is dedicated to Shiva.

Location 
Marudhanallur is located at a distance of 5 kilometres from Kumbakonam on the Mannargudi road.

Architecture 

The main idol is a shivalinga called Prithvi Linga made of sand. There is also another linga called Hanumantha Linga. There are shrines to Ganesha, Murugan, Dakshinamurti and the Navagrahas.

Significance 
The Saivite saint Sambandar had sung praises of the temple in the Thevaram. The neighbouring village of Enanallur is the birthplace of Enadi Nayanar, one of the 63 Nayanmars.

A trader named Dhananjayan had been cured of leprosy at this place and is frequented by people afflicted with the disease.

References

External links 
 

Shiva temples in Thanjavur district
Padal Petra Stalam